The hr-Bigband is the big band of Hessischer Rundfunk, the public broadcasting network of the German state of Hesse. Founded 1946 as Tanz- und Unterhaltungsorchester des Hessischen Rundfunks it was renamed to hr Big Band in 1972. Since 2005 it is written hr-Bigband. For international tours and CD releases it is also named Frankfurt Radio Bigband.

In the first decades mainly used to provide popular music for radio and TV shows it changed into a Jazz Big Band in the 1970s. The hr-Bigband plays approximately 50 concerts a year, covering a wide range of jazz styles and also crossing the boundaries to pop, classical, world and electronic music. After three years as artist in residence Jim McNeely became chief conductor in 2011.

Chief conductors 
 Willy Berking (1946–1972)
 Heinz Schönberger (1972–1989)
 Kurt Bong (1989–2000)
 Jörg Achim Keller (2000–2008)
 Örjan Fahlström (2008–2011)
 Jim McNeely (2011–present)

Discography
2013
Wunderkammer XXL - Michael Wollny, Tamar Halperin & hr-Bigband; Ltg.:Jörg Achim Keller
Rise & Arrive - Christian Elsässer & hr-Bigband

2012
Songs I Like a Lot - John Hollenbeck, Kate McGerry, Theo Bleckmann & hr-Bigband 
composed & arranged - Oliver Leicht & hr-Bigband

2010
Out of the Desert Live at Jazzfest Berlin - Joachim Kühn Trio & hr-Bigband (unter der Leitung von Ed Partyka; ausgezeichnet mit dem Echo Jazz 2012)
It's Only Love - Tania Maria und die hr-Bigband live (geleitet von Jörg Achim Keller)

2009
Money Jungle – Ellington reorchestrated (Neubearbeitung von Duke Ellingtons Money Jungle durch Jörg Achim Keller; Preis der deutschen Schallplattenkritik)
Viva o Som! - The Music of Hermeto Pascoal, arrangiert von Steffen Schorn
A Single Sky, composed Dave Douglas, conducted and arranged Jim McNeely, with Christian Jaksjø
Visions of Miles, arranged Colin Towns

2008
music for bigband vol. 1, featuring Jonas Schoen 
Limbic System Files, featuring nuBox, DJ Illvibe and Ed Partyka (Arranging, Conducting)

2007
hr-Bigband feat. Jack Bruce - arranged and conducted by Jörg Achim Keller, feat. Jack Bruce (Bass, Vocals, Guitar, Piano, Composition)

2006
Meeting of the Spirits - A Celebration of the Mahavishnu Orchestra, feat. Billy Cobham (Drums), arranged + directed by Colin Towns
Once in a Lifetime, feat. Joey DeFrancesco (Hammond Organ), Jeff Hamilton (Drums), Jörg Achim Keller (Ltg.)
Here's to Life, Here's To Joe, Jörg Achim Keller (Ltg.), Bill Ramsey (voc.)

2005 
Pictures at an Exhibition / Echoes of Aranjuez, Jörg Achim Keller, Bill Holman (Ltg.), Clare und Brent Fisher

2004 
Do It Again - Three Decades of Steely Dan, Fred Sturm (Ltg.), Ryan Ferreira (Git.)

2003
Two Suites: Tribal Dances / Cottacatya, Ralf Schmid, Martin Fondse (Ltg.)
Scorched (Mark-Anthony Turnage) mit John Scofield, John Patitucci, Peter Erskine, Radio-Sinfonie-Orchester Frankfurt unter Hugh Wolff (Ltg.)
¡Libertango! - Hommage an Astor Piazzolla, Enrique Tellería (Bandoneon), Fred Sturm (Arr.), Jörg Achim Keller (Ltg.)

2002
Swinging Christmas, Marjorie Barnes (Voc.), Frits Landesbergen (Vibraphon), Jörg Achim Keller (Ltg.)
 
2001
American Songs of Kurt Weill, Silvia Droste, Jeff Cascaro (Voc.), Jörg Achim Keller (Ltg.)
The Three Sopranos, Buddy DeFranco, Rolf Kühn, Eddie Daniels (Klarinette), Kurt Bong (Ltg.)
Futter für die Seele, Jazzkantine, Laith Al-Deen, Rolf Stahlhofen, Edo Zanki

References

External links
 hr-Bigband official website 
 hr-Bigband official website english information 
 hr-Bigband YouTube channel

Musical groups established in 1946
German jazz ensembles
Hessischer Rundfunk